Lee Chien-na (born 22 November 1984) is a Taiwanese singer and actress.

Career 
In 2007, Lee's entertainment career started as a participant in Season 2 of One Million Star.

In April 2009, Lee collaborated with Chou Chuan-huing, her teacher, on the song "Sad Glass" ("傷心酒杯"), which was included in his 2009 album, Lovers' Genesis.

Lee has starred in a number of films since 2010, namely Juliets (茱麗葉, 2010), Together (甜．秘密, 2012), To My Dear Granny (親愛的奶奶, 2013), Zinnia Flower, 52Hz, I Love You (2017) and numerous television series such as Ex-Boyfriend (2011). She also starred in Youth Power (哇！陳怡君, 2015).

One Million Star

Personal life
Lee Chien-na was raised in Nantou City. She has performed under the names Gina Lee and Nana Lee.

Lee was married, and had two children before that relationship ended in divorce. Her relationship with beatboxer  began in 2014 and ended in 2020.

Filmography

Television series

Film

Discography

Studio albums

Awards and nominations

References

External links

 

1984 births
Living people
Taiwanese film actresses
People from Nantou County
One Million Star contestants
21st-century Taiwanese singers
21st-century Taiwanese women singers
Taiwanese television actresses
21st-century Taiwanese actresses